Switzerland competed at the 1912 Summer Olympics in Stockholm, Sweden.

Athletics

A single athlete represented Switzerland. It was the nation's third appearance in athletics, and the second time that Julius Wagner was the only representative Switzerland sent in the sport. Wagner was in 20th place after the third round of the pentathlon, resulting in his elimination.

Ranks given are within that athlete's heat for running events.

References
Official Olympic Reports
International Olympic Committee results database

Nations at the 1912 Summer Olympics
1912
Olympics